Dashkhaneh (also Romanized as Dāshkhāneh; also known as Dāshkhān Taḵāb) is a village in Soltanabad Rural District, in the Central District of Khoshab County, Razavi Khorasan Province, Iran. At the 2006 census, its population was 22, in 9 families.

References 

Populated places in Khoshab County